Komodo Armament P1-95 is a 9x19 mm pistol manufactured by PT Komodo Armament Indonesia. It is designed for military and law enforcement use. The pistol frame is made from polymer material for light weight. The manufacturer offered several size variant of the slide, barrel and slide length to cover the different grip needs and change the overall pistol dimension.

See also 

 Pindad G2, 9x19 mm pistol made by Pindad

References 

9mm Parabellum semi-automatic pistols
Semi-automatic pistols of Indonesia